Dasharatha is a 2019 Kannada film directed by M. S. Ramesh and starring Ravichandran, Sonia Agarwal, and  Abhirami.

Plot
Dashratha, a righteous lawyer, leads a happy life with his wife, son and daughter. The latter completes her college and joins a job soon after. However, trouble begins in their happy life when his daughter falls in love with her employer.

Cast 
 Ravichandran as Advocate Dasharatha 
 Sonia Agarwal as Kousalya
 Abhirami as Krutika
 Hema Choudhary as Judge
 Meghashree as Dasharatha's daughter
 Rangayana Raghu
 Shobaraj
 Avinash
 Darshan - voice over in climax
 Abhilash

Production 
M. S. Ramesh was inspired to make a film with Ravichandran in the role of a lawyer after watching Yuddha Kaanda. Actress Sonia Agarwal returns to Kannada cinema after more than 15 years. The makers asked Darshan to sing a song in the film. The actor initially declined before accepting.

Soundtrack 
The music was composed by Gurukiran.

 "Dasharatha" (Title Track) - Darshan
 "Kari Kotu Hakorella" -  Gurukiran, Doddappa, Pichalli Srinivas
 "O Jeeva" - Ananya Bhat
 "Jagava Belaguva" - Sanjith Hegde, Chetana Acharya
 "Life is Beautiful" - Anuradha Bhat, Sanjith Hegde

Release 
The Times of India gave the film two out of five stars and wrote that "Dasharatha could have been a far more engaging story". The reviewer praised the performances of Sonia Agarwal and Abhirami in their comeback to Kannada cinema. Bangalore Mirror criticized the uninteresting plot while praising the film's dialogues.

References

External links
 

2010s Kannada-language films
Indian drama films
Indian courtroom films